Rheinhessen-Pfalz (rarely anglicized as "Rhine-Hesse-Palatinate") was one of the three Regierungsbezirke of Rhineland-Palatinate, Germany, located in the south of the state.  It was created in 1968 out of Regierungsbezirke Rheinhessen and Pfalz, which had themselves been created out of the left-bank territories of Bavaria and Hesse-Darmstadt before World War II.

Since 2000, the employees and assets of the Bezirksregierungen form the Aufsichts- und Dienstleistungsdirektion Trier (Supervisory and Service Directorate Trier) and the Struktur- und Genehmigungsdirektionen (Structural and Approval Directorates) Nord in Koblenz and Süd in Neustadt (Weinstraße). These administrations execute their authority over the whole state, e.g. the ADD Trier oversees all schools.

Kreise(districts)
 Alzey-Worms
 Bad Dürkheim
 Donnersbergkreis
 Germersheim
 Kaiserslautern
 Kusel
 Rhein-Pfalz-Kreis (formerly Ludwigshafen)
 Mainz-Bingen
 Südliche Weinstraße
 Südwestpfalz

''Kreisfreie Städte''(district-free towns)
 Frankenthal
 Kaiserslautern
 Landau
 Ludwigshafen
 Mainz
 Neustadt (Weinstraße)
 Pirmasens
 Speyer
 Worms
 Zweibrücken

Former states and territories of Rhineland-Palatinate
1968 establishments in West Germany
2000 establishments in Germany
Former government regions of Germany